Maravakandy Power House is located in Gudalur, Nilgiris, Tamil Nadu, India. It is controlled by the Tamil Nadu State Electricity Board and is 32 km from the Ooty. The elevation of the power house is above 884 meters and the installation capacity is 750KW.

See also

 Kundah hydro-electric power house
 Kateri hydro-electric system
 Moyar hydro-electric Power House
 Pykara

References

Hydroelectric power stations in Tamil Nadu
Buildings and structures in Nilgiris district
1992 establishments in Tamil Nadu
Energy infrastructure completed in 1992
20th-century architecture in India